Brock Williams (8 July 1894 – 19 February 1964) was a prolific English screenwriter with over 100 films to his credit between 1930 and 1962.  He also had a brief directorial career, and later also worked in television. Two of his novels The Earl of Chicago and Uncle Willie and the Bicycle Shop were both adapted into films.

Career
A native of Cornwall, in 1930 Williams joined Teddington Studios, the British arm of Warner Brothers, where he would spend the next 15 years.  The 1930s was the golden age of the quota quickie, when Teddington was churning out quickly and cheaply shot films by the week, so work was plentiful.  With few exceptions, these films were deemed of ephemeral value, with no worthwhile life after their first cinema run.  The unfortunate result for modern film historians is that a good proportion are now classed as lost films, while those that have survived did so more by chance than intention.  Films on which Williams worked included three early Michael Powell ventures Something Always Happens, The Girl in the Crowd and Someday, of which only the first is still extant.  Between 1936 and 1939 he also formed part of a regular four-way working partnership with director Arthur B. Woods, producer Irving Asher and cinematographer Basil Emmott, most notably on Q Planes.

The quota quickie, (Cinematograph Films Act 1927), assembly line died with the outbreak of World War II, when Britain's major studios started to concentrate on making fewer pictures with higher production values and quality, often with an overtly patriotic and propagandistic tone.  Williams remained contracted to Teddington until 1944, scripting such films as Contraband and Candlelight in Algeria.  He then went freelance, starting with the Gainsborough ghost story A Place of One's Own in 1945.

Williams made two forays into film directing, with the 1947 Phyllis Calvert melodrama The Root of All Evil and I'm a Stranger (1952), a comedy starring Greta Gynt.  He spent the rest of his film career mainly in the 1950s B-movie fields of thrillers and crime, with his last credits coming in two Lance Comfort productions in 1961 and 1962.  He also ventured into television, scripting eight episodes of early police procedural drama Fabian of the Yard for the BBC (1955–56), five episodes of historical adventure serial The Gay Cavalier  for Associated-Rediffusion (1957), and six of The New Adventures of Charlie Chan for ITC Entertainment (1957–58).  Williams died on 19 February 1964, aged 69.

Filmography

External links

Brock Williams at BFI Film & TV Database

1894 births
1964 deaths
English film directors
English male screenwriters
English television writers
People from Truro
British male television writers
20th-century English screenwriters
20th-century English male writers